Laurent Brochard (born 26 March 1968 in Le Mans, France) is a retired professional road racing cyclist from France. In 1997 he won a stage of the Tour de France and became world road champion in San Sebastián, Spain.

Brochard was a runner and started cycling competitively at 19.  He started with Castorama and became part of Festina cycling team.  His role in Festina was super-domestique, supporting stars such as Richard Virenque but able to ride competitively when given the chance.  He was implicated in the Festina scandal in the 1998 Tour de France.

After serving his suspension, Brochard joined Ag2r Prévoyance as leader and had successes in races such as Critérium International and Étoile de Béssèges.  He then moved to Bouygues Télécom.

He is a fan of Belgian comic character Marsupilami, often wearing Marsupilami logo and clothing at races.

Major results

1989
 1st Stage 4 Tour Poitou-Charentes en Nouvelle-Aquitaine
1990
 10th Overall Tour de la Communauté Européenne
1991
 10th Overall Circuit Franco-Belge
1992
 1st Stage 3 Tour Méditerranéen
 6th Overall Tour de l'Avenir
 7th Overall Tirreno–Adriatico
 7th Kuurne–Brussels–Kuurne
 7th Paris–Tours
 9th Trophée des Grimpeurs
1993
 1st Stage 2 Tour Méditerranéen
 2nd Road race, National Road Championships
 2nd Overall Route du Sud
 4th Paris–Camembert
 6th Overall Paris–Nice
 9th Overall Tour du Limousin
 9th Omloop Het Volk
1994
 1st  Overall Regio-Tour
1st Stage 5
 1st Tour du Haut-Var
 2nd Overall Circuit de la Sarthe
1st Stage 3
 3rd Overall Tour Méditerranéen
 3rd Paris–Camembert
 7th GP Ouest–France
 8th Grand Prix de Rennes
1995
 Tour de l'Ain
1st Stages 2, 3 & 4
 2nd Paris–Camembert
 6th Overall Four Days of Dunkirk
 9th Overall Tour Méditerranéen
1996
 1st  Overall Tour du Limousin
1st Stages 1 & 2
 1st La Polynormande
 2nd Road race, National Road Championships
 2nd Overall Grand Prix du Midi Libre
 2nd GP Ouest–France
 2nd Chrono des Herbiers
 5th Overall Paris–Nice
 5th Trophée des Grimpeurs
 7th Overall Three Days of De Panne
 7th Overall Critérium du Dauphiné Libéré
 7th Tour of Flanders
 8th La Flèche Wallonne
 9th Milan–San Remo
1997
 1st  Road race, UCI Road World Championships
 1st Stage 9 Tour de France
 Grand Prix du Midi Libre
1st Stages 3, 5 & 6
 4th Road race, National Road Championships
1998
 2nd Paris–Bourges
 3rd Overall Grand Prix du Midi Libre
1st Stage 6
 3rd La Polynormande
 6th Tour de Vendée
1999
 1st Stage 9 Vuelta a España
 2nd Bordeaux–Caudéran
 4th Time Trial, National Road Championships
 8th Züri–Metzgete
 8th Overall Vuelta a Asturias
2000
 1st Paris–Bourges
 1st Route Adelié
 2nd Overall Paris–Nice
1st Prologue
 2nd Classic Haribo
 3rd Overall Circuit de la Sarthe
 4th Gran Premio Città di Camaiore
 7th Overall Critérium International
1st Stage 3 (ITT)
 7th Overall Tour of Sweden
 9th Cholet-Pays de Loire
 9th EnBW Grand Prix
 9th Boucles de l'Aulne
2001
 1st Paris–Camembert
 1st Grand Prix de Villers-Cotterêts
 2nd Cholet-Pays de Loire
 2nd Trophée des Grimpeurs
 3rd Overall Tour Méditerranéen
 3rd Route Adélie
 4th Gran Premio di Lugano
 4th Paris–Bourges
 5th Overall Circuit de la Sarthe
1st Stage 1
 7th Gran Premio di Chiasso
 8th Overall Étoile de Bessèges
 9th Boucles de l'Aulne
 10th Grand Prix de Denain
2002
 1st  Overall Tour de Pologne
1st Stage 7
 1st  Overall Regio-Tour
1st Stage 4
 1st Stage 4 Grand Prix du Midi Libre
 2nd La Polynormande
 3rd Overall Four Days of Dunkirk
 3rd Route Adélie
 4th Overall Circuit de la Sarthe
 5th Overall Critérium International
 7th Cholet-Pays de Loire
 7th Paris–Bourges
 10th Classic Haribo
2003
 1st  Overall Critérium International
1st  Points classification
1st Stage 2
 1st Paris–Camembert
 1st  Points classification Paris–Nice
 1st Stage 5 Vuelta a Castilla y León
 2nd Overall Tour Méditerranéen
 3rd Overall Circuit de la Sarthe
 3rd Overall Four Days of Dunkirk
 3rd Route Adélie
 3rd Overall Danmark Rundt
 4th Overall Tour Poitou-Charentes en Nouvelle-Aquitaine
 4th Overall Tour de Pologne
2004
 1st  Overall Étoile de Bessèges
1st Stage 4
 2nd Overall Four Days of Dunkirk
 5th Overall Circuit de la Sarthe
1st Stage 3
 5th Overall Tour du Languedoc-Rousillon
 7th Overall Tour Méditerranéen
 7th Paris–Camembert
2005
 1st Paris–Camembert
 2nd Road race, National Road Championships
 5th Overall Tirreno–Adriatico
 8th Overall Circuit de la Sarthe
 10th Overall Tour Méditerranéen
2007
 1st  Mountains classification Tour de Romandie
 1st  Points classification Tour Down Under
 2nd Overall Tour de Luxembourg
1st Stage 2
 7th Overall Étoile de Bessèges
 9th Overall Critérium International
 9th Overall Paris–Corrèze
 10th Paris–Camembert

See also
 List of doping cases in cycling
List of sportspeople sanctioned for doping offences

External links
Profile at Bouygues Télécom official website
 Cyclingnews interview 2003

Cyclists at the 1996 Summer Olympics
Cyclists at the 2000 Summer Olympics
Cyclists at the 2004 Summer Olympics
French male cyclists
French Tour de France stage winners
French Vuelta a España stage winners
French sportspeople in doping cases
Olympic cyclists of France
UCI Road World Champions (elite men)
Doping cases in cycling
1968 births
Living people
Sportspeople from Le Mans
Cyclists from Pays de la Loire